Neviđane  is a village in Croatia. It is connected by the D110 highway.

References

Populated places in Zadar County
Pašman